Leverkusen – Cologne IV is an electoral constituency (German: Wahlkreis) represented in the Bundestag. It elects one member via first-past-the-post voting. Under the current constituency numbering system, it is designated as constituency 101. It is located in western North Rhine-Westphalia, comprising the city of Leverkusen and the northeastern part of Cologne.

Leverkusen – Cologne IV was created for the 2002 federal election. Since 2005, it has been represented by Karl Lauterbach of the Social Democratic Party (SPD).

Geography
Leverkusen – Cologne IV is located in western North Rhine-Westphalia. As of the 2021 federal election, it comprises the independent city of Leverkusen and the district of Mülheim from the independent city of Cologne.

History
Leverkusen – Cologne IV was created in 2002 and contained parts of the abolished constituencies of Leverkusen – Rheinisch-Bergischer Kreis II and Köln IV. In the 2002 through 2009 elections, it was constituency 102 in the numbering system. Since the 2013 election, it has been number 101.

Members
The constituency was first represented by Ernst Küchler of the Social Democratic Party (SPD) from 2002 to 2005. He was succeeded by fellow SPD member Karl Lauterbach in the 2005 election. Lauterbach was re-elected in 2009, 2013, 2017, and 2021.

Election results

2021 election

2017 election

2013 election

2009 election

References

Federal electoral districts in North Rhine-Westphalia
Politics of Cologne
Leverkusen
2002 establishments in Germany
Constituencies established in 2002